Cuttingsville is an unincorporated village in the town of Shrewsbury, Rutland County, Vermont, United States. Cuttingsville has a post office with ZIP code 05738.

References

Unincorporated communities in Rutland County, Vermont
Unincorporated communities in Vermont